The Newcastle sex abuse ring were a gang of seventeen men and a woman who sexually abused adolescent girls and young women from 2010 to 2014 in Newcastle upon Tyne, England, after plying them with alcohol and drugs. The men were of Albanian, Kurdish, Bangladeshi, Turkish, Iranian, Iraqi, Eastern European and Pakistani heritage who were aged between 27 and 44. A British man of Indian heritage was also charged for conspiracy to incite prostitution and supplying drugs to a victim. The victims ranged in age from 13 to 25.

Crimes

As in the Oxford, Rochdale and Rotherham prosecutions, the men pretended friendship and offered alcohol and drugs, winning the trust of their victims before initiating abusive sexual relationships. Victims told court that in some cases they were rendered unconscious by drugs and woke to find themselves undressed, having been subject to sexual assaults. The prosecution successfully argued that the victims, whose ages ranged from 13 to 25, were chosen because they were vulnerable and seemed less likely both to complain to the authorities and to be believed if they did so complain.

Operation Shelter, the specific police operation in Newcastle which led to the four trials, identified up to 108 potential victims, while the wider Operation Sanctuary, targeting abuse in the entire Northumbria police district, has identified up to 278 victims.

Reactions 

The British Labour politician Sarah Champion claimed regarding media news about this and previous trials, that there is a need to "acknowledge" that in all of the towns where similar cases have occurred "the majority of the perpetrators have been British Pakistani". She said: "We have got now, hundreds of Pakistani men who have been convicted of this crime, why are we not commissioning research to see what is going on and how we need to change what is going on. ... I genuinely think that it’s because more people are afraid to be called a racist than they are afraid to be wrong about calling out child abuse."

Investigations
The Newcastle case was one of several cases which prompted investigations looking into the claim that the majority of perpetrators from grooming gangs were British Pakistani; the first was by Quilliam in December 2017, which released a report entitled "Group Based Child Sexual Exploitation – Dissecting Grooming Gangs", which claimed 84% of offenders were of South Asian heritage. However this report was "fiercely" criticised for its unscientific nature and poor methodology by child sexual exploitation experts Ella Cockbain and Waqas Tufail, in their paper "Failing Victims, Fuelling Hate: Challenging the Harms of the 'Muslim grooming gangs' Narrative" which was published in January 2020.

A further investigation was carried out by the British government in December 2020, when the Home Office published their findings, showing that the majority of child sexual exploitation gangs were, in fact, composed of white men and not British Pakistani men.

Research has found that group-based child sexual exploitation offenders are most commonly white. Some studies suggest an overrepresentation of black and Asian offenders relative to the demographics of national populations. However, it is not possible to conclude that this is representative of all group-based CSE offending. 

Writing in The Guardian, Cockbain and Tufail wrote of the report that "The two-year study by the Home Office makes very clear that there are no grounds for asserting that Muslim or Pakistani-heritage men are disproportionately engaged in such crimes, and, citing our research, it confirmed the unreliability of the Quilliam claim".

Operation Sanctuary
A Northumbria Police probe into the abuse of one single girl uncovered serial abuse of teenage girls in Tyneside and resulted in the launch of "Operation Sanctuary," under which the initial arrests took place in January 2014 and had reached 67 arrests by the end of March that year.

In 2017, it was reported that 112 offenders had been handed jail terms totalling nearly 500 years for abusing more than 270 victims.

Gang members 
The 18 gang members were convicted of nearly 100 offences:

Mohammed Azram, 35, of Croydon Road, convicted of conspiracy to incite prostitution, sexual assault, supplying drugs to a victim
Jahangir Zaman, 43, of Hadrian Road, convicted of conspiracy to incite prostitution, rape, supplying drugs to a victim
Nashir Uddin, 35, of Joan Street, convicted of conspiracy to incite prostitution, supplying drugs to a victim
Saiful Islam, 34, of Strathmore Crescent, convicted of rape. Jailed for 10 years
Mohammed Hassan Ali, 33, of Bentinck Street, convicted of sexual activity with a child, supplying drugs to a victim. Jailed for seven years
Yasser Hussain, 27, of Canning Street, convicted of beating, possession of drugs. Jailed for two years
Abdul Sabe, 40, of Dean House, convicted of conspiracy to incite prostitution, trafficking within the UK for sexual exploitation, drugs offences
Habibur Rahim, 34, of Kenilworth Road, convicted of causing or inciting prostitution, drugs, sexual assault, trafficking within the UK for sexual exploitation
Badrul Hussain, 37, of Drybeck Court, convicted of drug offences
Mohibur Rahman, 44, of Northcote Street, pleaded guilty to conspiracy to incite prostitution, supplying drugs to a victim
Abdulhamid Minoyee, 33, of Gainsborough Grove, convicted of rape, sexual assault, supply of drugs
Carolann Gallon, 22, of Hareside Court, pleaded guilty to three counts of trafficking
Monjour Choudhury, 33, of Phillip Place, convicted of conspiracy to incite prostitution, supplying drugs to a victim
Prabhat Nelli, 33, of Sidney Grove, convicted of conspiracy to incite prostitution, supplying drugs to a victim
Eisa Mousavi, 41, of Todds Nook, convicted of conspiracy to incite prostitution, rape, supplying drugs to a victim
Taherul Alam, 32, of Normanton Terrace, convicted of conspiracy to incite prostitution, supplying drugs to a victim, attempted sexual assault
Nadeem Aslam, 43, of Belle Grove West, convicted of supplying drugs to victims
Redwan Siddquee, 32, of West Road, pleaded guilty to supply or offering to supply a class B drug. Jailed for 16 months

References 

2010s crimes in the United Kingdom
21st century in Newcastle upon Tyne
Child sexual abuse in England
Crime in Newcastle upon Tyne
Rape in England
Pakistani-British gangs
2010 crimes in the United Kingdom
Incidents of violence against girls
Incidents of violence against women